Lawrence William McCormick (February 3, 1933 – August 27, 2004) was an American television actor, reporter and news anchor, most notably working for Los Angeles television station KTLA-TV.

Biography

McCormick was born in Kansas City, Missouri to Pastor L.W. McCormick and Laura McCormick (pianist and vocalist). He began his broadcasting career in the late 1950s as a disc jockey, upon graduating from University of Kansas City. He first came to Los Angeles in 1958, working at then-R&B radio station KGFJ, from 1958-63. He later moved across town to popular Top-40 music outlet KFWB-AM from 1964-1968 before they instituted an all-news format in the spring of 1968.

McCormick became one of the first African-American newscasters in the country, leaving his morning drive slot as disc jockey on radio, KGFJ Los Angeles, where he was also PD, Program Director, from 1968-1969, transitioning to KCOP-TV winter of 1969. Shortly thereafter, he moved across town to KTLA in May 1971, and worked there until his death in 2004.

At KTLA, he served as a features reporter (such as business and health & fitness) on the station's 10 pm weeknight newscasts, while serving as lead anchor on its weekend editions, and co-hosting Making It! Minority Success Stories, a program which profiled successful minority business people.

On August 27, 2004, McCormick died of a cancer-related illness at Cedars-Sinai Medical Center in Los Angeles, at the age of 71.

Community involvement

McCormick was known to be very involved in the Los Angeles community, participating in various charities and events, including hosting local editions of the Jerry Lewis MDA Telethon, back when KTLA carried the telethon locally (the telethon has aired on KCAL-TV since 1996).  Also, for a twelve-year span (1988–2000), he hosted the Los Angeles Unified School District Academic Decathlon, including two national academic decathlons.

Film, stage and television acting career
In addition to being a news reporter, McCormick appeared in numerous films and television series over the years, often playing himself as a reporter, but also portrayed other kinds of characters.

In 1968, he made his stage acting debut as Speed in The Odd Couple at the Ebony Showcase Theater in Los Angeles. The production starred Nick Stewart and Morris Erby and was directed by James Wheaton.

As an actor, McCormick usually appeared in guest spots on TV shows, mostly on TV dramas and sitcoms, such as That Girl; Barnaby Jones; The Jeffersons (in a memorable 1979 episode as Florence's strict and ultra-conservative born-again Christian beau); Murder, She Wrote; Beverly Hills, 90210; and Angel (1999). He also made appearances in such movies as The Punisher (1989) and Terminator 3: Rise of the Machines (2003), which was his final film appearance. McCormick also did voice over work in such Saturday morning cartoon series as The Scooby-Doo/Dynomutt Hour and Dynomutt, Dog Wonder.

Awards and honors

In 1994, McCormick was honored with the Governors Award, a high, prestigious honor given annually by the Academy of Television Arts & Sciences.  In June 2001, KTLA honored McCormick by renaming one of its soundstages at Tribune Studios in his name.  He was also awarded a star on the Hollywood Walk of Fame for his work in Television.

Filmography

Television work (as actor)

 Adam-12 (1969) as Wesley
 That Girl (1969) as Reporter
 The Brady Bunch (1969) as TV Announcer
 Assault on the Wayne (1971) as Radio Operator
 McMillan & Wife (1971) as Announcer
 The Doris Day Show (1971-1972) as Jim
 Murdock's Gang (1973) as TV Reporter
 The Dream Makers (1975) as TV Commentator
 The Scooby-Doo/Dynomutt Hour (1976) as Mayor Gaunt (voice)
 The Last Hurrah (1977) as Election announcer
 Dynomutt, Dog Wonder (1978) as Mayor Gaunt (voice)
 The Rockford Files (1978) as Newscaster
 The Jeffersons (1979) as Buzz Thatcher
 Barnaby Jones (3 episodes, 1973–1979) as TV Announcer 
 Blind Ambition (1979, TV miniseries) as TV Commentator
 Act of Violence (1979) as Sportscaster
 240-Robert (1981) as Newscaster
 Between Two Brothers (1982) as Reporter
 Shooting Stars (1983) (TV) as T.V. Newsman
 Murder, She Wrote (1984) as TV Reporter
 Matt Houston (1984) as Newsman
 The Fall Guy (1984)
 Streets of Justice (1985) as TV Reporter #1
 Alfred Hitchcock Presents (1985) as TV Anchorman
 Cagney & Lacey (1985) as Reporter #1
 The Case of the Hillside Stranglers (1989) as Newscaster
 Dear John (1989) as The Reporter
 Mathnet (1990) as Anchorman
 Knots Landing (1989–1990) as Reporter / TV Announcer / Presenter
 Columbo: Columbo Goes to College (1990) as News Anchor
 Midnight Run for Your Life (1994) as Newscaster
 Sliders (1999) as Weatherman
 Beverly Hills, 90210 (1999) as Reporter
 Angel (2003) as Himself

References

External links
Jet Magazine: Los Angeles Television Station Honors Black Newsman Larry McCormick
KTLA tribute to Larry McCormick
 

1933 births
2004 deaths
Male actors from Kansas City, Missouri
African-American television personalities
American male journalists
20th-century American journalists
Television anchors from Los Angeles
American male television actors
American male film actors
University of Missouri–Kansas City alumni
Deaths from cancer in California
Burials at Forest Lawn Memorial Park (Hollywood Hills)
20th-century American male actors
20th-century African-American people
21st-century African-American people